Magic Town is a 1947 comedy film directed by William A. Wellman and starring James Stewart and Jane Wyman. The picture is one of the first films about the then-new practice of public opinion polling. The film was inspired by the Middletown studies. It is also known as The Magic City.

The "magic" of the title is the mathematical miracle (as it is called in the film) that certain towns can be used to fairly accurately predict the actions of the whole country.

Plot
Lawrence "Rip" Smith (James Stewart) is a former basketball player and ex-military who now runs a company that performs polls and consumer surveys. Lately he has started obsessing about being able to find a perfect mathematical "miracle formula" to perform the perfect survey, and compete for real with his rival companies. Because he lacks funds, he is far behind his number one rival, George Stringer.

One day Rip discovers that a survey made by a friend and ex-Army colleague of his, Hoopendecker (Kent Smith), in the small town of Grandview, exactly matches one that Stringer has made on a national level. Rip concludes that the small town demographic is a perfect match for the country as a whole, and believes he has finally found his miracle formula.

Eager to test his theory, Rip sells a survey on progressive education to a client, with a promise the result will stand for the whole country. Furthermore he promises to deliver the result the same day as Stringer's company, even though the rival has been working on the project for quite some time.

Rip and his team of professionals then travel to Grandview to perform the survey. They are pretending to be insurance salesmen. But trouble starts already when Rip overhears a conversation between a woman named Mary Peterman (Jane Wyman) trying to convince the mayor (Harry Holman) to expand the town and build a number of new buildings: a civic center. Rip wants this town to stay exactly as it is, so he can make his perfect surveys, mirroring the demographic of the country. Rip holds an electrifying speech to preserve the town, and the conservative members of the town council listen to him rather than Mary, whose proposition is laid to the side.

Mary writes a bold and angry editorial against Rip in the local newspaper, which is run by her family. Rip starts a charm offensive towards Mary to soften her up, but she holds her ground. The two combatants are attracted to each other though. They spend a lot of time together while Rip secretly gathers information for his survey. One of Rip's colleagues warns him that he is becoming too involved in the subject he is supposed to be studying, but Rip is blinded by his attraction to Mary. Rip starts coaching the school basketball team, and attends a school dance where he meets Mary's family. When Rip later slips away to talk to his client over the phone, Mary follows him, eavesdrops on the conversation, and finds out the truth about Rip being in town.

Angered by his deceit, she publishes the story in the newspaper the next day. A larger nationwide paper picks up the story, and soon the town is crawling with reporters. The town is called "the public opinion capital of the U.S." and its inhabitants start selling their views on consumer products on every street corner. The city council start making bold plans to expand the town, and both Rip and Mary feel ashamed of what they have done to change the town structure. Rip leaves Grandview and Mary and returns home. Soon enough a strange poll from Grandview says Americans would want a female president. The town is ridiculed in the press and the expansion plans get an abrupt ending.

But Rip cannot forget Mary, and he returns to Grandview to reveal his true feelings. Mary admits she has feelings for him too, but also tells Rip that they have to fix the mess they have caused in Grandview before they can start a relationship. Rip starts by talking to a Grandview U.S. Senator Wilton (George Irving), to get help from him raising money to save the town. They display their plan in front of the city council, but the lead council member, Richard Nickleby, is negative. Upset, Rip tells Nickleby that he is "walking out on the team".

Later, Rip learns from Nickleby's son Hank (Mickey Kuhn) that his father already has sold land where the main expansion would take place to a company. To stop this, Rip manages to publish parts of the council speech a few weeks earlier, where it said that they would expand the town "with their own hands". A lot of inhabitants who read the article start demanding that the city council build on the designated land to save the reputation of the town.

It turns out the property sale agreement was not formally correct and the land is returned to the town. The inhabitants all pitch in to build a civic center on the land, and Rip and Mary become a couple.

Cast

 James Stewart as Rip Smith
 Jane Wyman as Mary Peterman
 Kent Smith as Hoopendecker
 Ned Sparks as Ike
 Wallace Ford as Lou Dicketts
 Regis Toomey as Ed Weaver
 Ann Doran as Mrs. Weaver
 Donald Meek as Mr. Twiddle
 Ann Shoemaker as Ma Peterman
 Mickey Kuhn as Hank Nickleby
 George Irving as Senator Wilton
 Julia Dean as Mrs. Wilton
 Paul Scardon as Hodges
 Ray Walker as Stinger's Associate
 Harry Holman as Mayor
 Robert Dudley as Dickey
 George Chandler as Bus Driver
 Edgar Dearing as Questioning Grandview Citizen 
 Dick Elliott as New Arrival 
 Franklyn Farnum as Townsman  
 Bess Flowers as Mayor's Secretary  
 Gabriel Heatter as Gabriel Heatter - Radio Newscaster  
 Tom Kennedy as Moving Man  
 Knox Manning as Radio Broadcaster  
 Ken Niles as Reporter  
 Vic Perrin as Elevator Starter  
 Snub Pollard as Townsman  
 Cyril Ring as Newspaper Man  
 Dick Wessel as Moving Man  
 Lee "Lasses" White as Shoe Shine Man 
 Joe Yule as Radio Comic

Reception
As with Stewart's previous film, It's a Wonderful Life, the film was a box office flop at the time of its release.

The film recorded a loss of $350,000.

References

External links
 
 
 
 

1947 films
1947 comedy films
American black-and-white films
American comedy films
1940s English-language films
Films directed by William A. Wellman
Films scored by Roy Webb
Opinion polling in the United States
RKO Pictures films
Films with screenplays by Robert Riskin
1940s American films
English-language comedy films